Davide Voltan (born 15 April 1995) is an Italian footballer who plays as a attacking midfielder for  club FeralpiSalò, on loan from Südtirol.

Career
On 31 August 2017, he joined to FeralpiSalò on loan.

On 11 January 2019, he signed a 2.5-year contract with Serie C club Vis Pesaro.

On 2 September 2020, he signed a three year contract with Reggiana. On 19 January 2021, he was loaned to Südtirol.

On 7 July 2021, he moved to Südtirol on a permanent basis and signed a three-year contract.

On 3 January 2023, he returned to FeralpiSalò on loan.

References

External links
tgbiancoscudato.it 

1995 births
Living people
Sportspeople from Padua
Italian footballers
Association football midfielders
Serie B players
Serie C players
Calcio Padova players
F.C. Crotone players
Bassano Virtus 55 S.T. players
Genoa C.F.C. players
A.C. Ancona players
FeralpiSalò players
Vis Pesaro dal 1898 players
A.C. Reggiana 1919 players
F.C. Südtirol players
Italy youth international footballers
Footballers from Veneto